Tifatul Sembiring (born 28 September 1961) is an Indonesian politician. He was chairman of the Islamic Prosperous Justice Party and Minister of Communication and Information in the Second United Indonesia Cabinet.

Biography

Life and Family 
His father is Karo and moved to Bukittinggi where he married a Minangkabau woman. Tifatul is the head of the big family in Guguak Tabek Sarojo, Agam, West Sumatra by the title Datuk Tumangguang. He is married to Sri Rahayu and has seven children: Sabriana, Fathan, Ibrahim, Yusuf, Fatimah, Muhammad and Abdurrahman Sembiring.

Education 
Tifatul has a degree in computer engineering from the Information and Computing Management School, Jakarta, and was active in a number of Indonesian Islamic organisations from his student days, such as PII, the Indonesian Student's Association

Controversy

In 2009, he blamed immorality for a Sumatra earthquake and other natural disasters. As he addressed a Friday prayer meeting in Padang, Sumatra, the minister said "there were many television programmes that destroyed morals. Therefore, natural disasters would continue to occur."

His ambition to filter the internet for 'negative' content, shelved in early 2010 in the face of broad opposition, may be revived after a celebrity sex scandal centred on Ariel (Nazril Irham), which Sembiring controversially linked to the crucifixion of Jesus Christ. The move apparently has the backing of then-president Dr Susilo Bambang Yudhoyono and would involve a blacklist of offensive material monitored by a special task force,  which gave birth to the controversial 'Internet Positif.'

He has also linked pornography to HIV/Aids and said that funding to fight the disease was a waste of money, also stating that the widespread availability of Indonesian pornography, mostly featuring students, caused natural disasters. He was much criticized for quoting Adolf Hitler on his Twitter page, posting "the union between two children, when both of them complete each other, this is magic - Adolf Hitler". He was questioned by Indonesian Twitter users for shaking the hand of U.S. First Lady Michelle Obama during her husband's November 2010 trip to Indonesia. His hesitation in condemning the kidnapping of 276 girls by the terrorist group Boko Haram in Nigeria drew criticism and raises question at his suitability to serve in the government.

In May 2014, the Communication Minister tweeted from his personal account that video sharing site Vimeo would be banned. Citing Indonesia’s controversial anti-pornography law, passed in 2008, the minister said the site included displays of “nudity or nudity-like features”. The ban came at a moment when films made in Indonesia had begun to attract attention on the world stage, with Joshua Oppenheimer’s “The Act of Killing” joining the ranks of the most acclaimed documentaries of all time.

On 26 February 2016, he tweeted from his personal account quoting Islamic hadith that promotes killing people who practice homosexuality. This sparked criticism from general public, Muslim scholars and human rights advocates due to growing intolerance towards LGBT community in Indonesia. He responded to the critics by calling them anti prophet Mohammed and anti Quran, but eventually deleted the post yet remained unapologetic.

Legislator
Sembiring had been elected three times into the People's Representative Council, firstly in the 2009 election where he represented North Sumatra's first electoral district. He was reelected there in 2014, and again in 2019. In the 2019 legislature, Sembiring was the chair of the Prosperous Justice Party's faction.

References

1961 births
Living people
People from Bukittinggi
Government ministers of Indonesia
Prosperous Justice Party politicians
Indonesian Muslims
Minangkabau people
Karo people
Members of the People's Representative Council, 2009
Members of the People's Representative Council, 2014
Members of the People's Representative Council, 2019